Wang Xue may refer to:

 Wang Xue (speed skater), short track speed skater
 Wang Xue (gymnast), Chinese rhythmic gymnast